Lawrenceburg Township is one of fourteen townships in Dearborn County, Indiana. As of the 2010 census, its population was 10,985 and it contained 4,796 housing units.

Geography
Old Channel Lake and Twin Lakes are in this township.

Cities and towns
 Aurora (north edge)
 Greendale
 Hidden Valley (south edge)
 Lawrenceburg

Unincorporated towns
 Hardinsburg
 Homestead
 Lawrenceburg Junction
 Oldtown
(This list is based on USGS data and may include former settlements.)

Major highways
  Interstate 275
  U.S. Route 50
  State Road 1
  State Road 48

Cemeteries
The township contains three cemeteries: Greendale, Guard and Miller.

See also
Whitewater Canal

References
 
 United States Census Bureau cartographic boundary files

External links

 Indiana Township Association
 United Township Association of Indiana

Townships in Dearborn County, Indiana
Townships in Indiana